The Yavapai County Sheriff's Office (YCSO) is a local law enforcement agency that serves Yavapai County, Arizona. It provides general-service law enforcement to unincorporated areas of Yavapai County, serving as the equivalent of the police for unincorporated areas of the county. It also operates the county jail system. The Yavapai County Sheriff's Office (YCSO) is headquartered in Prescott, Arizona.

Organization
The current Sheriff is David Rhodes. The YCSO has three divisions:
 Law Enforcement Services Division
 Northern Area Command
 Eastern Area Command
 Southern Area Command
 Criminal Investigations
 Detention Services Division
 Administrative Services
 Central ID Services
 Housing Services
 Inmate Services
 Transportation Services
 Medical Services
 Support Services Division
 Administrative Project Management
 Records
 Communications / Dispatch
 Recruitment & Training
 Information Technology

Sheriffs

Notes
 Appointed
 Resigned
 Abandoned

† died in office

Fallen officers
Since the establishment of the Yavapai County Sheriff's Office, eight officers have died in the line of duty.

See also 

 List of law enforcement agencies in Arizona
 Little Miss Nobody case

References

External links
 Yavapai County government official website
 Yavapai County Sheriff’s Office at the Sharlot Hall Museum

Sheriffs' offices of Arizona
Government of Yavapai County, Arizona
Prescott, Arizona
1864 establishments in Arizona Territory